is a railway station in the city of  Shinshiro, Aichi Prefecture, Japan, operated by Central Japan Railway Company (JR Tōkai).

Lines
Hon-Nagashino Station is served by the Iida Line, and is located 31.2 kilometers from the starting point of the line at Toyohashi Station.

Station layout
The station has a single island platform. The station building is a one-story wooden structure connected to the platform by a level crossing. The station building is staffed.

Platforms

Adjacent stations

|-
!colspan=5|Central Japan Railway Company

Station history
On March 15, 1929 it was briefly renamed  but reverted to its original name only two weeks later. On May 22, 1929, the now defunct Taguchi Line connected to the station. On August 1, 1943, the Horaiji Railway was nationalized along with some other local lines to form the Japanese Government Railways (JGR) Iida Line and the station was renamed to its present name. The Taguchi Line ceased operations in 1969. Scheduled freight operations were discontinued in 1971. Along with its division and privatization of JNR on April 1, 1987, the station came under the control and operation of the Central Japan Railway Company.

Surrounding area
 Hōrai-ji
 Japan National Route 151

See also
 List of Railway Stations in Japan

References

External links

Railway stations in Japan opened in 1923
Railway stations in Aichi Prefecture
Iida Line
Stations of Central Japan Railway Company
Shinshiro, Aichi